The first large-scale Asian–African or Afro–Asian Conference—also known as the Bandung Conference—was a meeting of Asian and African states, most of which were newly independent, which took place on 18–24 April 1955 in Bandung, West Java, Indonesia. The twenty-nine countries that participated represented a total population of 1.5 billion people, 54% of the world's population.
The conference was organized by Indonesia, Burma (Myanmar), India, Ceylon (Sri Lanka), and Pakistan and was coordinated by Ruslan Abdulgani, secretary general of the Ministry of Foreign Affairs of the Republic of Indonesia.

The conference's stated aims were to promote Afro-Asian economic and cultural cooperation and to oppose colonialism or neocolonialism by any nation. The conference was an important step towards the eventual creation of the Non-Aligned Movement (NAM) yet the two initiatives ran in parallel during the 1960s, even coming in confrontation with one another prior to the 2nd Cairo NAM Conference in 1964.

In 2005, on the 50th anniversary of the original conference, leaders from Asian and African countries met in Jakarta and Bandung to launch the New Asian–African Strategic Partnership (NAASP). They pledged to promote political, economic, and cultural cooperation between the two continents.

Background
Indonesia's President Sukarno and India's prime minister Jawaharlal Nehru were key organizers, in their quest to build a nonaligned movement that would win the support of the newly emerging nations of Asia and Africa. Nehru first got the idea at the Asian Relations Conference, held in India in March 1947, on the eve of India's independence. There was a second 19-nation conference regarding the status of Indonesia, held in New Delhi, India, in January 1949. Although Nehru initially attached relatively little importance to Indonesia's calls to convene the Bandung Conference, he showed increasing interest during and after late 1954 due to his concern about American foreign policy as it applied to Asia, his belief that he could secure a guarantee of peaceful coexistence with China, and his desire to avoid embarrassing Indonesia. Practically every month a new nation in Africa or Asia emerged with, for the first time, its own diplomatic corps and eagerness to integrate into the international system.

Mao Zedong of China was also a key organizer, backed by his influential right-hand man, Premier and Foreign Minister Zhou Enlai; although Mao still maintained good relations with the Soviet Union in these years, he had the strategic foresight to recognize that an anti-colonial nationalist and anti-imperialist agenda would sweep Africa and Asia, and he saw himself as the natural global leader of these forces as he, after all, had also led a revolution in China marked by anti-colonial nationalism. In his efforts to present China as a "normal state" to the world, Mao publicly maintained a friendly, conciliatory tone towards newly independent Asian nations, while simultaneously adopting a highly belligerent disposition towards the Western colonial empires.

At the Colombo Powers conference in April 1954, Indonesia proposed a global conference. A planning group met in Bogor, West Java in late December 1954 and formally decided to hold the conference in April 1955. They had a series of goals in mind: to promote goodwill and cooperation among the new nations; to explore in advance their mutual interests; to examine social economic and cultural problems, to focus on problems of special interest to their peoples, such as racism and colonialism, and to enhance the international visibility of Asia and Africa in world affairs.

The Bandung Conference reflected what the organizers regarded as a reluctance by the Western powers to consult with them on decisions affecting Asia in a setting of Cold War tensions; their concern over tension between the People's Republic of China and the United States; their desire to lay firmer foundations for China's peace relations with themselves and the West; their opposition to colonialism, especially France's neocolonialism in North Africa and its colonial rule in Algeria; and Indonesia's desire to promote its case in the West New Guinea dispute with the Netherlands. One of Sukarno's primary goals with the conference was to build support for Indonesia's claim to West Papua and to prevent the Netherlands from transferring sovereignty of West Papua to indigenous Papuans.

Sukarno portrayed himself as the leader of this group of states, which he later described as "NEFOS" (Newly Emerging Forces).

On 4 December 1954 the United Nations announced that Indonesia had successfully gotten the issue of West New Guinea placed on the agenda of the 1955 General Assembly. Plans for the Bandung conference were announced in December 1954.

Discussion

Major debate centered around the question of whether Soviet policies in Eastern Europe and Central Asia should be censured along with Western colonialism. A memo was submitted by 'The Moslem Nations under Soviet Imperialism', accusing the Soviet authorities of massacres and mass deportations in Muslim regions, but it was never debated. A consensus was reached in which "colonialism in all of its manifestations" was condemned, implicitly censuring the Soviet Union, as well as the West. China played an important role in the conference and strengthened its relations with other Asian nations. Having survived an assassination attempt on the way to the conference, the Chinese premier, Zhou Enlai, displayed a moderate and conciliatory attitude that tended to quiet fears of some anticommunist delegates concerning China's intentions.

Later in the conference, Zhou Enlai signed an agreement on dual nationality with Indonesian foreign minister Sunario.  World observers closely watched Zhou. He downplayed revolutionary communism and strongly endorsed the right of all nations to choose their own economic and political systems, including even capitalism. His moderation and reasonableness made a very powerful impression for his own diplomatic reputation and for China.  By contrast, Nehru was bitterly disappointed at the generally negative reception he received. Senior diplomats called him arrogant. Zhou said privately,  "I have never met a more arrogant man than Mr. Nehru."

Participants

Some nations were given "observer status". Such was the case of Brazil, who sent Ambassador Bezerra de Menezes.

Declaration
A 10-point "declaration on promotion of world peace and cooperation", called Dasasila Bandung (Bandung's Ten Principles, or Bandung Spirit, or Bandung Declaration; styled after Indonesia's Pancasila; or Ten Principles of Peaceful Coexistence), incorporating the principles of the United Nations Charter as well as Five Principles of Peaceful Coexistence was adopted unanimously as item G in the final communiqué of the conference:
Respect for fundamental human rights and for the purposes and principles of the charter of the United Nations
Respect for the sovereignty and territorial integrity of all nations
Recognition of the equality of all races and of the equality of all nations large and small
Abstention from intervention or interference in the internal affairs of another country
Respect for the right of each nation to defend itself, singly or collectively, in conformity with the charter of the United Nations
(a) Abstention from the use of arrangements of collective defence to serve any particular interests of the big powers (b) Abstention by any country from exerting pressures on other countries
Refraining from acts or threats of aggression or the use of force against the territorial integrity or political independence of any country
Settlement of all international disputes by peaceful means, such as negotiation, conciliation, arbitration or judicial settlement as well as other peaceful means of the parties own choice, in conformity with the charter of the United Nations
Promotion of mutual interests and cooperation
Respect for justice and international obligations

The final Communique of the Conference underscored the need for developing countries to loosen their economic dependence on the leading industrialised nations by providing technical assistance to one another through the exchange of experts and technical assistance for developmental projects, as well as the exchange of technological know-how and the establishment of regional training and research institutes.

United States involvement

For the US, the Conference accentuated a central dilemma of its Cold War policy: by currying favor with Third World nations by claiming opposition to colonialism, it risked alienating its colonialist European allies. The US security establishment also feared that the Conference would expand China's regional power. In January 1955 the US formed a "Working Group on the Afro-Asian Conference" which included the Operations Coordinating Board (OCB), the Office of Intelligence Research (OIR), the Department of State, the Department of Defense, the Central Intelligence Agency (CIA), and the United States Information Agency (USIA). The OIR and USIA followed a course of "Image Management" for the US, using overt and covert propaganda to portray the US as friendly and to warn participants of the Communist menace.

The United States, at the urging of Secretary of State John Foster Dulles, shunned the conference and was not officially represented. However, the administration issued a series of statements during the lead-up to the Conference. These suggested that the US would provide economic aid, and attempted to reframe the issue of colonialism as a threat by China and the Eastern Bloc.

Representative Adam Clayton Powell, Jr. (D-N.Y.) attended the conference, sponsored by Ebony and Jet magazines instead of the U.S. government. Powell spoke at some length in favor of American foreign policy there which assisted the United States's standing with the Non-Aligned. When Powell returned to the United States, he urged President Dwight D. Eisenhower and Congress to oppose colonialism and pay attention to the priorities of emerging Third World nations.

African American author Richard Wright attended the conference with funding from the Congress for Cultural Freedom. Wright spent about three weeks in Indonesia, devoting a week to attending the conference and the rest of his time to interacting with Indonesian artists and intellectuals in preparation to write several articles and a book on his trip to Indonesia and attendance at the conference. Wright's essays on the trip appeared in several Congress for Cultural Freedom magazines, and his book on the trip was published as The Color Curtain: A Report on the Bandung Conference. Several of the artists and intellectuals with whom Wright interacted (including Mochtar Lubis, Asrul Sani, Sitor Situmorang, and Beb Vuyk) continued discussing Wright's visit after he left Indonesia.

Outcome and legacy

The conference was followed by the Afro-Asian People's Solidarity Conference in Cairo in September (1957) and the Belgrade Summit (1961), which led to the establishment of the Non-Aligned Movement.

Asian-African Summit of 2005
To mark the 50th anniversary of The Summit, Heads of State and Government of Asian-African countries attended a new Asian-African Summit from 20 to 24 April 2005 in Bandung and Jakarta hosted by President Susilo Bambang Yudhoyono. Attended by Prime Minister of Japan, Junichiro Koizumi, President of China, Hu Jintao, United Nations Secretary General, Kofi Annan, President of Pakistan, Pervez Musharraf, President of Afghanistan, Hamid Karzai, Prime Minister of Malaysia, Abdullah Ahmad Badawi, Sultan of Brunei, Hassanal Bolkiah and President of South Africa, Thabo Mbeki, some sessions of the new conference took place in Gedung Merdeka (Independence Building), the venue of the original conference.

Of the 106 nations invited to the historic summit, 89 were represented by their heads of state or government or ministers. The Summit was attended by 54 Asian  and 52 African countries.

The 2005 Asian African Summit yielded, inter-alia, the Declaration of the New Asian–African Strategic Partnership (NAASP), the Joint Ministerial Statement on the NAASP Plan of Action, and the Joint Asian African Leaders’ Statement on Tsunami, Earthquake and other Natural Disasters. The conclusion of aforementioned declaration of NAASP is the Nawasila (nine principles) supporting political, economic, and socio-cultural cooperation.

The Summit concluded a follow-up mechanism for institutionalization process in the form of Summit concurrent with Business Summit every four years, Ministerial Meeting every two years, and Sectoral Ministerial as well as Technical Meeting if deemed necessary.

Other anniversaries
On the 60th anniversary of the Asian-African Conference and the 10th anniversary of the NAASP, a 3rd summit was held in Bandung and Jakarta from 21 to 25 April 2015, with the theme Strengthening South-South Cooperation to Promote World Peace and Prosperity.

Hosted by President Joko Widodo of Indonesia, delegates from 109 Asian and African countries, 16 observer countries and 25 international organizations participated, including Prime Minister of Japan Shinzo Abe, President of China Xi Jinping, Prime Minister of Singapore Lee Hsien Loong, King Abdullah II of Jordan, Prime Minister of Malaysia Najib Tun Razak, President of Myanmar Thein Sein, King Mswati III of Swaziland and Prime Minister of Nepal Sushil Koirala.

See also
Asian–African Legal Consultative Organization
Five Principles of Peaceful Coexistence
Sino-Indonesian Dual Nationality Treaty
Third World

References

Further reading
 Acharya, Amitav. "Studying the Bandung conference from a Global IR perspective." Australian Journal of International Affairs 70.4 (2016): 342–357. Online 
 Acharya, Amitav. "Who are the norm makers? The Asian-African conference in Bandung and the evolution of norms." Global Governance 20.3 (2014): 405–417. Online
 Asia-Africa Speaks From Bandung. Jakarta: Ministry of Foreign Affairs, Republic of Indonesia, 1955.
 Ampiah, Kweku. The Political and Moral Imperatives of the Bandung Conference of 1955 : the Reactions of the US, UK and Japan. Folkestone, UK : Global Oriental, 2007. 
 Brown, Colin. 2012. "The Bandung Conference and Indonesian Foreign Policy", Ch 9 in Anne Booth, Chris Manning and Thee Kian Wie, 2012, Essays in Honour of Joan Hardjono, Jakarta: Yayasan Pustaka Obor Indonesia.
 Burke, Roland. "The compelling dialogue of freedom: Human rights at the Bandung Conference." Human Rights Quarterly  28 (2006): 947+.
 Dinkel, Jürgen, The Non-Aligned Movement. Genesis, Organization and Politics (1927–1992), New Perspectives on the Cold War 5, Brill: Leiden/Boston 2019.  
 Finnane, Antonia, and Derek McDougall, eds, Bandung 1955: Little Histories. Melbourne: Monash Asia Institute, 2010. 
 Kahin, George McTurnan. The Asian-African Conference: Bandung, Indonesia, April 1955. Ithaca: Cornell University Press, 1956.
 Lee, Christopher J., ed, Making a World After Empire: The Bandung Moment and Its Political Afterlives. Athens, OH: Ohio University Press, 2010. 
 Mackie, Jamie. Bandung 1955: Non-Alignment and Afro-Asian Solidarity. Singapore: Editions Didier Millet, 2005. 
 Parker, Jason C. "Small Victory, Missed Chance: The Eisenhower Administration, the Bandung Conference, and the Turning of the Cold War." In The Eisenhower Administration, the Third World, and the Globalization of the Cold War. Ed. Kathryn C. Statler & Andrew L. Johns. Lanham, MD: Rowman & Littlefield, 2006. 
 Parker, Jason. "Cold War II: The Eisenhower Administration, the Bandung Conference, and the reperiodization of the postwar era." Diplomatic History 30.5 (2006): 867–892.
 Shimazu, Naoko. "Diplomacy as theatre: staging the Bandung Conference of 1955." Modern Asian Studies 48.1 (2014): 225–252. https://doi.org/10.1017/S0026749X13000371
 Wood, Sally Percival. "‘Chou gags critics in BANDOENG or How the Media Framed Premier Zhou Enlai at the Bandung Conference, 1955" Modern Asian Studies 44.5 (2010): 1001–1027.

External links
 Modern History Sourcebook: Prime Minister Nehru: Speech to Asian-African Conference Political Committee, 1955
 Modern History Sourcebook: President Sukarno of Indonesia: Speech at the Opening of the Asian-African Conference, 18 April 1955
 

1955 conferences
1955 in Indonesia
1955 in international relations
20th-century diplomatic conferences
April 1955 events in Asia
Bandung
Diplomatic conferences in Indonesia
Liberal democracy period in Indonesia
Non-Aligned Movement
Sukarno
Zhou Enlai